|}

The Leamington Novices' Hurdle is a Grade 2 National Hunt hurdle race in Great Britain which is open to horses aged five years or older. It is run at Warwick over a distance of about 2 miles and 5 furlongs (4,225 metres), and during its running there are eleven hurdles to be jumped. The race is for novice hurdlers, and it is scheduled to take place each year in January. It was first run in 2002. Since 2018 the race has been sponsored by the Ballymore Group.

Records
Leading jockey (3 wins):
 Harry Skelton – Three Musketeers (2015), Beakstown (2019), Grey Dawning (2023)

Leading trainer (3 wins):

 Dan Skelton - Three Musketeers (2015), Beakstown (2019), Grey Dawning (2023)

Winners

See also
 Horse racing in Great Britain
 List of British National Hunt races

References
 Racing Post:

 pedigreequery.com – Leamington Novices' Hurdle – Warwick.
 breakingnews.ie – "Warwick abandoned" (2009).
 bbc.co.uk – "Weather prospects for racing" (2010).

National Hunt races in Great Britain
Warwick Racecourse
National Hunt hurdle races
Recurring sporting events established in 2002
2002 establishments in England